Cryptogemma phymatias is a species of sea snail, a marine gastropod mollusk in the family Turridae, the turrids.

Description
(Original description) The white rather high and narrow shell is thin. It is angulated and tubercled on the angle, spiralled, with a short round base, small snout, and openly constricted suture. 

Sculpture : Longitudinals—there are only harsh, irregular, unequal lines of growth. Spirals — the shell is rather broadly carinated in the middle of the whorls by three fine threads, which are united and made prominent by a series of narrow elongated tubercles.  This is where the apex of the sinus occurs. 

The whole base and snout are scored with feeble threads, one of which, about half-way down the base, is a little more prominent than the rest. The shoulder of the shell above the keel has also some spiral threads, of which the one nearest the suture is also studded with small tubercles. 

The colour of the shell is greyish yellow.

The spire is high and conical. Its profile lines are cut into zigzags by the projecting keels of the
successive whorls and the contracted sutures between. The apex is broken. Only 5¼ whorls remain. They are of slow increase, are biconical, contracting (with a straight outline) from the keel into the suture both above and below. The body whorl is short, with a slightly tumid rounded base contracting into a small equal-sided snout. The suture is very distinct, being contracted, impressed, and submarginated below. It is a little oblique. The aperture is pear-shaped, sharply pointed above and below. The outer lip is very thin, with a very deep open U-shaped sinus, which is separated from the suture by a large broad triangular shelf. The edge of the shell sweeps very far forward from the sinus and then advances straight  down the siphonal canal. The inner lip has a thin glaze on the body. Its line is concave above, then straight down the columella, the point of which is cut off to the left and very much twisted at the point, leaving the short narrow oblique siphonal canal very open.

Distribution
This marine species occurs off the Philippines.

References

External links
 Dall W.H. (1908). Reports on the dredging operations off the west coast of Central America to the Galapagos, to the west coast of Mexico, and in the Gulf of California, in charge of Alexander Agassiz, carried on by the U.S. Fish Commission steamer "Albatross," during 1891, Lieut.-Commander Z.L. Tanner, U.S.N., commanding. XXXVII. Reports on the scientific results of the expedition to the eastern tropical Pacific, in charge of Alexander Agassiz, by the U.S. Fish Commission steamer "Albatross", from October, 1904 to March, 1905, Lieut.-Commander L.M. Garrett, U.S.N., commanding. XIV. The Mollusca and Brachiopoda. Bulletin of the Museum of Comparative Zoology. 43(6): 205-487, pls 1-22
 Haas F. (1949). On some deepsea mollusks from Bermuda. Buttletí de la Institució Calalana d'Història Natural 37: 69-73
 Schepman M.M. (1913) The Prosobranchia of the Siboga Expedition. Part V. Toxoglossa, with a supplement. Siboga-Expeditie, 49e: 365-452, pls. 25-34
 Zaharias P., Kantor Y.I., Fedosov A.E., Criscione F., Hallan A., Kano Y., Bardin J. & Puillandre N. (2020). Just the once will not hurt: DNA suggests species lumping over two oceans in deep-sea snails (Cryptogemma). Zoological Journal of the Linnean Society. DOI: 10.1093/zoolinnean/zlaa010/5802562
 

phymatias
Gastropods described in 1886